The 2009–10 Football League Cup (known as the Carling Cup due to the competition's sponsorship by lager brand Carling) was the 50th season of the Football League Cup, a knock-out competition for the top 92 football clubs played in English football league system. Manchester United successfully defended their League Cup title after defeating Aston Villa by 2–1 in the final at Wembley Stadium on 28 February 2010.

Each season, the League Cup winners – like the winners of the FA Cup – were granted a place in the UEFA Europa League for the following season. However, in cases where a team had already gained a place in European competition via their league position or progress in other cup competitions, their place in the Europa League was deferred to the next-placed league side. In this season, since Manchester United and FA Cup winners Chelsea qualified for the UEFA Champions League via the Premier League, Aston Villa and Liverpool qualified for the Europa League as the sixth- and seventh-placed sides in the league.

First round 
The draw for the First Round took place on 16 June 2009, with matches played two months later in the week beginning 10 August 2009.

Newcastle United and Middlesbrough received a first round bye as the highest ranked Football League teams from the previous season's league placings. The other 70 of the 72 Football League clubs competed in the First Round, divided into North and South sections. Each section was divided equally into a pot of seeded clubs and a pot of unseeded clubs. Clubs' rankings depend upon their finishing position in the 2008–09 season.

1 Score after 90 minutes

Second round 
 The 13 Premier League teams not involved in European competitions entered at this stage, along with the winners from the First Round plus Newcastle United and Middlesbrough, who received a First Round bye. From the Second Round onwards, the teams are no longer split geographically. The draw for the Second Round took place on 12 August 2009, after the First Round games had been completed, and the matches were played in the week beginning 24 August 2009.

1 Score after 90 minutes

Third round 
The seven Premier League teams involved in European competition enter at this stage, along with the winners from the Second Round. The draw for the Third Round took place on 29 August 2009, after the Second Round games had been played. The matches were played in the week beginning 21 September 2009.

1 Score after 90 minutes

Fourth round 
The draw for the Fourth Round took place after the Third Round games had been played, on 26 September 2009, and the matches were played on the week beginning on 26 October 2009. The only clubs from outside the Premier League left in the draw were Barnsley, Peterborough United and Scunthorpe United.

1 Score after 90 minutes

Fifth round 
The Fifth Round draw took place on 31 October, and the matches were played in the week commencing 30 November 2009.

Semi-finals 
The semi-final draw took place on 2 December 2009, after the completion of the first three Fifth Round matches. The first leg matches were to be played the week commencing 4 January 2010, but adverse weather conditions including severe snow and ice in North West England caused the games to be rearranged.

First leg

Second leg 

Aston Villa won 7–4 on aggregate.

Manchester United won 4–3 on aggregate.

Final 

The final was played at Wembley Stadium, London, on Sunday, 28 February 2010.

Prize money 
The prize money is awarded by the Football League. The winners of the League Cup won £100,000 and the runners-up won £50,000. The losing semi-finalists each took home £25,000.

References

External links 
 Official Carling Cup website
 Carling Cup News at football-league.co.uk
 Carling Cup at bbc.co.uk

EFL Cup seasons
League Cup
League Cup
Football League Cup